"Soundbwoy" is a song by British singer Stylo G. It was produced by Dutch born producer Diztortion. The song was released in the United Kingdom as a digital download on 26 May 2013 on iTunes. The song entered the UK Singles Chart at number 18 and at number 29 in Scotland.

Music video
A music video to accompany the release of "Soundbwoy" was first released onto YouTube on 8 March 2013 at a total length of two minutes and forty-four seconds.

Track listing

Charts

Release history

References

2013 singles
Stylo G songs
2013 songs
Songs written by Diztortion